China is a municipality in the Mexican state of Nuevo León.

According to a 2010 census done by the National Institute of Statistics and Geography (INEGI), China had 10,867 inhabitants. The town is home to the Presa El Cuchillo reservoir and has different theme parks.

Localities 
 San Bernardo

References

Municipalities of Nuevo León